Antonio da Vendri (active 1517–1545) was a 16th-century Italian Renaissance painter.

Not much is known about Antonio da Vendri's life except through his works. Documents show he worked in Verona between 1517 and 1545, not only as a painter, but also as a baker and tailor. As an artist he primarily painted religious-themed paintings for church commissions. One work executed by Antonio da Vendri, The Giusti Family of Verona, is part of the National Gallery collection. He also painted a Madonna and Child with Two Angels in 1518 (Verona, Castelvecchio Museum), and painted frescoes (now lost) in Toblino Castle near Levico Terme, Trentino, in 1536 for Cardinal Bernardo Clesio. A fresco fragment to attributed Antonio da Vendri, Madonna and Child and Saint Roch, survives in the church of Santa Maria in Stelle, Verona.

References

External links

Year of birth unknown
Year of death unknown
15th-century Italian painters
Italian male painters
16th-century Italian painters
Italian Renaissance painters